The Monster Factory is a 
professional wrestling school located in Paulsboro, New Jersey owned and operated by Danny Cage. It is considered to be the first publicly available professional wrestling school.  Larry Sharpe opened the Monster Factory wrestling school with "Nature Boy" Buddy Rogers in 1983. The school's first famous pupil was Scott "Bam Bam" Bigelow, whose success brought a lot of attention to the school.

Pretty Boy Larry Sharpe's Monster Factory (1983–2011)

Sharpe's first pupils included Tony Atlas, King Kong Bundy, and Bam Bam Bigelow, who Sharpe broke in at New York City nightclub Studio 54. Some were attracted to train at the school by Bigelow's success, which made the school notable enough to attract future attendee Raven while Tatanka would end up at the school by a chance meeting with Rogers in a video rental store.

2008 fire

In February 2008, the school was threatened by a fire which had started at the building adjacent to the school, ANA Laboratories, and the building was evacuated by the school trainers. The fire was confined to the laboratory until its roof collapsed; however, according to Camden County Chief Fire Marshal Paul Hartstein, only a firewall prevented the fire from reaching the school. The school had been in the middle of drills when the fire broke out, although all the students were safely evacuated to the outside parking lot.

The World Famous Monster Factory (2011-Present)
In 2011, Danny Cage purchased the name from Larry Sharpe. Monster Factory relocated to the Paulsboro Wrestling Club in Paulsboro, New Jersey. Following the move, Cage began to supplement training with seminars featuring WWE scout Gerald Brisco, Ring of Honor lead announcer Kevin Kelly, Ohio Valley Wrestling's Rip Rogers, Les Thatcher, as well as wrestlers Montel Vontavious Porter, Colt Cabana, Stevie Richards, Bob Evans, Robbie E, The Powers of Pain, and Sean Waltman. The Monster Factory also conducts birthday parties and ring rentals.

The Monster Factory puts on monthly shows that feature matches from the school's students as well as established stars. In late 2013, Cage had his first pupil signed to a WWE development deal. Stephen Kupryk, known at the Monster Factory as Tommy Maclin and now as Steve Cutler, left the Monster Factory in January 2014 and made his NXT debut as Cutler in June 2014. In November 2014, Ultimate Fighting Championship fighter Matt Riddle enlisted in the school. Additionally, Monster Factory students and graduates have appeared as extras and performers on WWE Raw, WWE SmackDown, WWE NXT, and Ring of Honor television since Cage assumed control of the school.

Notable alumni
The Monster Factory's graduates include:

Current trainers

Danny Cage
The Blue Meanie
Billy Wiles
Q. T. Marshall

Previous trainers
 Larry Sharpe (deceased)

References

External links
Official website

1983 establishments in New Jersey
Professional wrestling schools
Paulsboro, New Jersey